Rongmei may refer to:

 Rongmei people, an ethnic group of north-eastern India
 Rongmei language, the Sino-Tibetan language they speak

Language and nationality disambiguation pages